The Magic House may refer to:

 The Magic House (film), a 1939 Czech film
 The Magic House (TV series), a 1994–1996 British children's television puppet show that aired on Scottish Television
 The Magic House, St. Louis Children's Museum, children's museum in  Missouri
 The Magic House is a magical event in the television series Teletubbies about a puppet who walks around his pink house and sings from one of his windows.